Michael Bruce Curry (born March 13, 1953) is an American bishop who is the 27th and current presiding bishop and primate of The Episcopal Church. Elected in 2015, he is the first African American to serve as presiding bishop in The Episcopal Church. He was previously bishop of the Diocese of North Carolina.

Early life and education
Curry noted in his autobiography that both sides of his family were descended from slaves and sharecroppers in North Carolina and Alabama. He was born in Maywood, Illinois, a suburb just west of Chicago. His grandfather and great-grandfather were Baptist ministers. His parents were Dorothy and the Rev. Kenneth Curry, who had been Baptists but became Episcopalians when they were allowed to drink from the same chalice as whites in racially segregated Ohio. His mother died when he was young; his father and grandmother raised him.

Curry attended public schools in Buffalo, New York. He graduated with high honors from Hobart College in Geneva, New York, in 1975. He then earned a Master of Divinity degree, in 1978, from the Yale Divinity School, in association with Berkeley Divinity School. Curry has also studied at The College of Preachers, Princeton Theological Seminary, Wake Forest University, the Ecumenical Institute at St. Mary's Seminary in Baltimore, and the Institute of Islamic, Christian, and Jewish Studies.

Ministry as priest
Curry was ordained deacon at St. Paul's Cathedral, Buffalo, New York by the Rt. Rev. Harold B. Robinson in June 1978 and priest at St. Stephen's, Winston-Salem, North Carolina by the Rt. Rev. John M. Burgess in December 1978. He served initially as deacon-in-charge and subsequently as rector of St. Stephen's Episcopal Church (1978–1982) in Winston-Salem, North Carolina; then as rector of St. Simon of Cyrene Episcopal Church in Lincoln Heights, Ohio (1982–1988). He served as rector of St. James' Episcopal Church in Baltimore, Maryland (1988–2000). In his three parish ministries, Curry participated in crisis response pastoral care, the founding of ecumenical summer day camps for children, preaching missions, creation of networks of family day care providers, and the brokering of investment in inner city neighborhoods. He inspired a $2.5 million restoration of the St. James' church building after a fire.

Ministry as diocesan bishop

Curry was elected eleventh bishop of the Episcopal Diocese of North Carolina on February 11, 2000. When he was consecrated at Duke Chapel in Durham on June 17, 2000, he became the first African-American diocesan bishop of the Episcopal Church in the American South. Nearly 40 bishops participated in the service, including Robert Hodges Johnson, J. Gary Gloster, and Barbara C. Harris as consecrators.

As a diocesan bishop, he served on the board of directors of the Alliance for Christian Media and chaired the board of Episcopal Relief and Development. He also had a national preaching and teaching ministry and was a frequent speaker at services of worship and conferences around the country.

Throughout his ministry in North Carolina, Curry was also active in issues of social justice, speaking out on immigration policy and marriage equality. Curry also instituted a network of canons, deacons, and youth ministry professionals to support preexisting ministries in local congregations. Curry also led the Diocese of North Carolina to focus on the Millennium Development Goals through a $400,000 campaign to buy malaria nets that saved over 100,000 lives.

Ministry as presiding bishop
On May 1, 2015, the joint nominating committee for the election of the presiding bishop of the Episcopal Church nominated Curry and three other bishops as candidates for 27th presiding bishop and primate of the Episcopal Church. The election occurred on June 27, 2015, at the 78th General Convention meeting in Salt Lake City. Curry was elected by the House of Bishops meeting in St. Mark's Cathedral on the first ballot with 121 of 174 votes cast. Laity and clergy in the House of Deputies ratified Curry's election later the same day. Curry was installed as presiding bishop and primate on November 1, 2015, All Saints' Day, during a Eucharist at Washington National Cathedral. The service included readings in Spanish and Native American languages.

Dismissals of high ranking staff members
Among Curry's first acts as presiding bishop in December 2015 was placing three senior staff at Episcopal Church headquarters on administrative leave pending investigation for violating workplace policies. In April 2016, Curry followed up by dismissing Bishop Stacy Sauls as Chief Operating Officer, as well as two other senior administrators, although Sauls remains a bishop.  When announcing the staff dismissals, Curry stated:  ... Our task as staff is to serve The Episcopal Church in such a way that it can serve the world in the Name and in the Spirit of Jesus Christ. We are therefore all called to strive for and adhere to the highest standards of personal and professional conduct embodying the love of God and reflecting the teachings and the way of Jesus.
The precise nature of the policy violations noted by Curry was never disclosed nor were criminal charges filed.

Revival tours
During 2017 and 2018, Curry launched a series of revivals "that promise to stir and renew hearts for Jesus, to equip Episcopalians as evangelists, and to welcome people who aren't part of a church to join the Jesus Movement." The revivals include multi-day public events in the Episcopal Dioceses of Pittsburgh, West Missouri, Georgia, San Joaquin, and Honduras and will culminate in a "joint evangelism mission" with the Church of England in July 2018.

Anglican Communion

Primates' gathering in 2016
In January 2016, Primates in the Anglican Communion gathered at Canterbury Cathedral, mother church of the global Anglican Communion, at the invitation of the Justin Welby, Archbishop of Canterbury. It was the first such meeting attended by Curry as presiding bishop. Human sexuality and the Episcopal Church's July 2015 approval of same-sex marriage rites were prominent topics of discussion.

The primates in attendance unanimously resolved to walk together before a majority of Anglican primates also publicly sanctioned the Episcopal Church, for a period of three years, demanding that it "no longer represent us on ecumenical and interfaith bodies, should not be appointed or elected to an internal standing committee and that while participating in the internal bodies of the Anglican Communion, they will not take part in decision making on any issues pertaining to doctrine or polity."

In the aftermath of the sanctions, Curry maintained his public support for same-sex marriage stating:

Our commitment to be an inclusive church is not based on a social theory or capitulation to the ways of the culture, but on our belief that the outstretched arms of Jesus on the cross are a sign of the very love of God reaching out to us all. While I understand that many disagree with us, our decision regarding marriage is based on the belief that the words of the Apostle Paul to the Galatians are true for the church today: All who have been baptized into Christ have put on Christ. There is no longer Jew or Gentile, slave or free, male or female, for all are one in Christ. For so many who are committed to following Jesus in the way of love and being a church that lives that love, this decision will bring real pain. For fellow disciples of Jesus in our church who are gay or lesbian, this will bring more pain. For many who have felt and been rejected by the church because of who they are, for many who have felt and been rejected by families and communities, our church opening itself in love was a sign of hope. And this will add pain on top of pain.

As part of the final communique from the gathering, the Anglican primates announced that the Archbishop of Canterbury would appoint a "task group" aimed at healing the rift and rebuilding of mutual trust amidst deep differences. The Archbishop of Canterbury named Curry as one of the 10 members of that "task group" in May 2016.

Delegation to Rome
In October 2016, Curry represented the Anglican Communion as part of a delegation of Anglican primates to the Vatican led by the Archbishop of Canterbury. The leaders joined together in an ecumenical Vespers service led jointly by the Archbishop of Canterbury and the Roman Pontiff, followed by a private meeting between Pope Francis and the Anglican primates. The events honored the fiftieth anniversary since then Archbishop of Canterbury Michael Ramsey and Pope Paul VI met in 1966, the first such meeting since the English Reformation in the 16th century. The meeting also celebrated the 50th anniversary since the Anglican Centre in Rome was established. Curry emphasized the need for Christian cooperation publicly stating:

[the] mission of the church is to help the human family, with all its variety and all its diversity and all its differences, to find a way to become not simply a disparate community but a human family of God. Dr. Martin Luther King said it this way, "we shall either learn to live together as brothers and sisters, or we'll perish together as fools." The choice is ours, chaos or community.

Curry's presence in Rome was criticized by Nicholas Okoh, Archbishop of Nigeria and chairman of the traditionalist group Global Anglican Future Conference (GAFCON). Okoh publicly stated that Curry's invitation was a violation of sanctions established by Anglican primates during their January 2016 gathering in Canterbury.

Royal wedding
Curry was invited by Prince Harry and Meghan Markle to deliver the sermon at their wedding. The wedding took place on May 19, 2018, at St George's Chapel, Windsor Castle in England. Curry's 14-minute sermon attracted considerable comment and reactions were largely positive.

The sermon emphasized the redemptive potential of love and used fire as a metaphor for its power and significance. His enthusiastic style was reportedly well received by some attending the wedding and the address was described as "electrifying the wedding" having "won smiles but also some quizzical glances" and even upstaging the bride. The address was wide-ranging in its sources quoting from Martin Luther King Jr., the traditional African-American spiritual "There Is a Balm in Gilead", New Testament epistles, and the French Jesuit priest and scientist, Pierre Teilhard de Chardin. In the aftermath of the wedding Curry received widespread international attention, has published a book, and offered several widely republished soundbites on the service, such as "I could feel slaves", and has been frequently interviewed by American media outlets as to provide a spiritual perspective in the aftermath of significant events.

Other services
On September 1, 2018, Bishop Curry served as the officiant for the state funeral of Senator John McCain. Shortly thereafter, Curry officiated at the funeral of George H. W. Bush in the Washington National Cathedral on December 5, 2018. Less than a week later he delivered a sermon-like address at "The Spirit of Apollo" program organized by the National Air and Space Museum. The program was held at Washington National Cathedral and commemorated the 50th anniversary of the Apollo 8 mission to the moon.

Honors
Curry has received honorary degrees from the School of Theology-Sewanee, Virginia Theological Seminary, Berkeley Divinity School at Yale, the Episcopal Divinity School, the Seminary of the Southwest, and Church Divinity School of the Pacific.  
Curry was appointed a serving brother of the Order of St John by Elizabeth II on July 25, 2015. In 2019 he received the James Parks Morton Interfaith Award.

Personal life
Curry and his wife Sharon (née Clement) have two adult daughters. He underwent surgery as treatment for prostate cancer in 2018.

Published works
 
 
 
 
 Love is the Way: Holding on to Hope in Troubling Times. New York, NY: Avery. 2020. .

See also
 Historical list of the Episcopal bishops of the United States
 List of Episcopal bishops of the United States
 List of presiding bishops of the Episcopal Church in the United States of America

References

External links

 Drake, Gavin.  "In Profile: Presiding Bishop Michael Curry," Anglican Communion News Service, November 12, 2015.

1953 births
Living people
African-American Christian clergy
African-American Episcopalians
African-American writers
American Episcopal priests
Episcopal Church in North Carolina
Presiding Bishops of the Episcopal Church in the United States of America
Serving Brothers of the Order of St John
Wake Forest University alumni
Writers from Chicago
Yale Divinity School alumni
Episcopal bishops of North Carolina
21st-century African-American people
20th-century African-American people